A rare disease is a disease that affects a small percentage of the population. In some parts of the world, an orphan disease is a rare disease whose rarity means there is a lack of a market large enough to gain support and resources for discovering treatments for it, except by the government granting economically advantageous conditions to creating and selling such treatments. Orphan drugs are ones so created or sold.

Most rare diseases are genetic in origin and thus are present throughout the person's entire life, even if symptoms do not immediately appear. Many rare diseases appear early in life, and about 30% of children with rare diseases will die before reaching their fifth birthdays. With only four diagnosed patients in 27 years, ribose-5-phosphate isomerase deficiency is considered the rarest known genetic disease.

No single number has been agreed upon for which a disease is considered rare. Global Genes has estimated that currently approximately 10,000 rare diseases exist globally, with 80% of these having identified genetic origins.

Definition
There is no single, widely accepted definition for rare diseases. Some definitions rely solely on the number of people living with a disease, and other definitions include other factors, such as the existence of adequate treatments or the severity of the disease.

In the United States, the Rare Diseases Act of 2002 defines rare disease strictly according to prevalence, specifically "any disease or condition that affects fewer than 200,000 people in the United States", or about 1 in 1,500 people. This definition is essentially the same as that of the Orphan Drug Act of 1983, a federal law that was written to encourage research into rare diseases and possible cures.

In Japan, the legal definition of a rare disease is one that affects fewer than 50,000 patients in Japan, or about 1 in 2,500 people.

However, the European Commission on Public Health defines rare diseases as "life-threatening or chronically debilitating diseases which are of such low prevalence that special combined efforts are needed to address them". The term low prevalence is later defined as generally meaning fewer than 1 in 2,000 people. Diseases that are statistically rare, but not also life-threatening, chronically debilitating, or inadequately treated, are excluded from their definition.

The definitions used in the medical literature and by national health plans are similarly divided, with definitions ranging from 1/1,000 to 1/200,000.

Relationship to orphan diseases
Because of definitions that include reference to treatment availability, a lack of resources, and severity of the disease, the term orphan disease is used as a synonym for rare disease. But in the United States and the European Union, "orphan diseases" have a distinct legal meaning.

The United States' Orphan Drug Act includes both rare diseases and any non-rare diseases "for which there is no reasonable expectation that the cost of developing and making available in the United States a drug for such disease or condition will [be] recovered from sales in the United States of such drug" as orphan diseases.

The European Organization for Rare Diseases (EURORDIS) also includes both rare diseases and neglected diseases into a larger category of "orphan diseases".

Prevalence
Prevalence (number of people living with a disease at a given moment), rather than incidence (number of new diagnoses in a given year), is used to describe the impact of rare diseases. The Global Genes Project estimates some 300 million people worldwide are affected by a rare disease.

The European Organization for Rare Diseases (EURORDIS) estimates that between 3.5 and 5.9% of the world's population is affected by one of approx. 6,000 distinct rare diseases identified to-date. European Union has suggested that between 6 and 8% of the European population could be affected by a rare disease sometime in their lives.

About 80% of rare diseases have a genetic component and only about 400 have therapies, according to Rare Genomics Institute.

Rare diseases can vary in prevalence between populations, so a disease that is rare in some populations may be common in others. This is especially true of genetic diseases and infectious diseases. An example is cystic fibrosis, a genetic disease: it is rare in most parts of Asia but relatively common in Europe and in populations of European descent. In smaller communities, the founder effect can result in a disease that is very rare worldwide being prevalent within the smaller community. Many infectious diseases are prevalent in a given geographic area but rare everywhere else. Other diseases, such as many rare forms of cancer, have no apparent pattern of distribution but are simply rare. The classification of other conditions depends in part on the population being studied: All forms of cancer in children are generally considered rare, because so few children develop cancer, but the same cancer in adults may be more common.

About 40 rare diseases have a far higher prevalence in Finland; these are known collectively as Finnish heritage disease. Similarly, there are rare genetic diseases among the Amish religious communities in the US and among ethnically Jewish people.

Characteristics
A rare disease is defined as one that affects fewer than 200,000 people across a broad range of possible disorders. Chronic genetic diseases are commonly classified as rare. Among numerous possibilities, rare diseases may result from bacterial or viral infections, allergies, chromosome disorders, degenerative and proliferative causes, affecting any body organ. Rare diseases may be chronic or incurable, although many short-term medical conditions are also rare diseases.

Public research and government policy

United States
The NIH's Office of Rare Diseases Research (ORDR) was established by H.R. 4013/Public Law 107–280 in 2002. H.R. 4014, signed the same day, refers to the "Rare Diseases Orphan Product Development Act". Similar initiatives have been proposed in Europe. The ORDR also runs the Rare Diseases Clinical Research Network (RDCRN). The RDCRN provides support for clinical studies and facilitating collaboration, study enrollment and data sharing.

United Kingdom
In 2013, the United Kingdom government published The UK Strategy for Rare Diseases which "aims to
ensure no one gets left behind just because they have a rare disease", with 51 recommendations for care and treatment across the UK to be implemented by 2020. Health services in the four constituent countries agreed to adopt implementation plans by 2014, but by October 2016, the Health Service in England had not produced a plan and the all-party parliamentary group on Rare, Genetic and Undiagnosed Conditions produced a report Leaving No One Behind: Why England needs an implementation plan for the UK Strategy for Rare Diseases in February 2017. In March 2017 it was announced that NHS England would develop an implementation plan. In January 2018 NHS England published its Implementation Plan for the UK Strategy for Rare Diseases. In January 2021 the Department of Health and Social Care published the UK Rare Diseases Framework, a policy paper which included a commitment that the four nations would develop action plans, working with the rare disease community, and that "where possible, each nation will aim to publish the action plans in 2021". NHS England published England Rare Diseases Action Plan 2022 in February 2022.

International
Organisations around the world are exploring ways of involving people affected by rare diseases in helping shape future research, including using online methods to explore the perspectives of multiple stakeholders.

Public awareness 
Rare Disease Day is held in Europe, Canada, the United States and India on the last day of February to raise awareness for rare diseases.

See also 

 National Organization for Rare Disorders (NORD)
 Undiagnosed Diseases Network (UDN)
 Orphanet (Online portal for rare diseases and orphan drugs)
 ICD coding for rare diseases
 List of rare disease organisations
 Orphanet Journal of Rare Diseases (academic journal)
 Rare Disease Day
 Idiopathic disease
 Mystery Diagnosis
 Health care rationing

References

External links 

 ICD-11 FAQ
 Database of rare diseases at GARD, The United States Genetic and Rare Diseases Information Center
 Database of rare diseases at Orphanet
 National Organization for Rare Disorders (United States)
 Rare Disease UK
 Rare diseases search engine